SM UC-38 was a German Type UC II minelaying submarine or U-boat in the German Imperial Navy during World War I. The U-boat was ordered on 20 November 1915 and was launched on 25 June 1916. She was commissioned into the German Imperial Navy on 26 October 1916 as SM UC-38. UC 38 was a successful commerce raider, operating throughout her career in the Mediterranean theatre. In nine patrols UC-38 was credited with sinking 43 ships, either by torpedo or by mines laid. She was sunk in December 1917 in an action off Cape Ducato, Greece, during which she torpedoed the French cruiser Chateaurenault.

Design
A German Type UC II submarine, UC-38 had a displacement of  when at the surface and  while submerged. The submarine was powered by two six-cylinder four-stroke diesel engines each producing  (a total of ), two electric motors producing , and two propeller shafts.

UC-38 was fitted with six  mine tubes, eighteen UC 200 mines, three  torpedo tubes (one on the stern and two on the bow), seven torpedoes, and one  Uk L/30 deck gun. Her complement was twenty-six crew members.

Action off Cape Ducato
UC-38 approached and fired one torpedo on Chateaurenault, which was hit in her middle section at 6:47. UC-38 dived at 38 metres, while the Mameluk and Rouen rushed to the launching position of the torpedo, and Lansquenet started picking up people thrown overboard by the explosion. Chateaurenault requested her escorts to close in and evacuate personnel, which was completed by 07:26. The trawler Balsamine came to the rescue and made attempts to take Chateaurenault in tow.

Back to periscope depth, UC-38 saw Chateaurenault still afloat, and fired a second torpedo, which hit at 8:20; Chateaurenault foundered quickly, but all personnel still alive aboard could be rescued. Lansquenet, in the process of picking up her launches, rushed to the launching point and fired 7 depth charges. One caused a light leak in the submarine; Captain Wendlandt ordered a dive to bring his ship below the area targeted by the grenades, but a false manœuvre made UC-38 climb instead, and a second explosion caused a large leak, forcing Wendlandt to crash surface and abandon ship.

UC-38 surfaced briefly and was immediately targeted by the guns of Mameluk, which continued her attack by launching several depth charges. UC-38 surfaced again, and this time both Mameluk and Lansquenet opened fire, hitting her several times and killing several of her crew as they exited. She sank at 8:40, and the French destroyers picked up the survivors.

German sources claim that 25 men were rescued and 9 killed; a sailor of UC-38 claimed that 20 men were saved out of a 28-man crew; French enquiry reports 20 rescued and 5 confirmed dead out of a 27-man crew.

Sinking 
Sir Ronald Ross, first British Nobel laureate for his discovery of the malaria vector, embarked aboard the cruiser  at Taranto, Italy, on 13 December 1917 on his way to Salonika. Ross recounts the moment the SM UC-38 was destroyed in his 1923 memoirs:"Suddenly all the soldiers began pointing in one direction and one behind me said ‘Voyez monsieur’. There, 200 yards from us, was the deck of an emerging submarine. She had been touched by one of our depth-charges. Her crew were jumping off her deck into the sea, one after the other, as fast as they could like frogs. In another minute a storm of shells and shot ploughed up the water round her. The our captain yelled out ‘Asseyez vous’. We were going to fire off our own big gun...Our shell took effect; up rose the stern of the submarine and then slowly down she slid, as her victim had done, leaving a number of pink heads dotting the water – Boches clamouring to be saved. A Frenchman near me was handing round pistols to shoot at them, but our captain promptly stopped that. Boats went out and rescued 18 of the German crew; they came aboard naked and shivering but happy! For some reason we were all happy together."

Summary of raiding history

References

Notes

Citations

Bibliography

 
 

Ships built in Hamburg
German Type UC II submarines
U-boats commissioned in 1916
Maritime incidents in 1917
U-boats sunk in 1917
World War I submarines of Germany
World War I minelayers of Germany
World War I shipwrecks in the Mediterranean Sea
1916 ships
U-boats sunk by French warships